Tungsten(IV) chloride is an inorganic compound with the formula WCl4.  It is a diamagnetic black solid.  The compound is of interest in research as one of a handful of binary tungsten chlorides.

Structure and preparation 
WCl4 is usually prepared by reduction tungsten hexachloride.  Many reductants have been reported, including red phosphorus, tungsten hexacarbonyl, gallium, tin, and antimony.  The latter is reported to be optimal:

Like most binary metal halides, WCl4 is polymeric.  It consists of linear chains of tungsten atoms each in octahedral geometry.  Of six chloride ligands attached to each W center, four are bridging ligands.  The W-W separations are alternatingly bonding (2.688 Å) and nonbonding (3.787 Å).

Reactions
Reduction of tungsten(IV) chloride with sodium yields the ditungsten(III) heptachloride derivative:
2 WCl4  +  5 thf  +  2 Na   →   [Na(thf)3][W2Cl7(thf)2]  +  NaCl

References 

Chlorides
Tungsten halides